A pycnidium (plural pycnidia) is an asexual fruiting body produced by mitosporic fungi, for instance in the order Sphaeropsidales (Deuteromycota, Coelomycetes) or order Pleosporales (Ascomycota, Dothideomycetes). It is often spherical or inversely pearshaped (obpyriform) and its internal cavity is lined with conidiophores. When ripe, an opening generally appears at the top, through which the pycnidiospores escape.

References

Further reading
Kulik, Martin M. "Symptomless infection, persistence, and production of pycnidia in host and non-host plants by Phomopsis batatae, Phomopsis phaseoli, and Phomopsis sojae, and the taxonomic implications." Mycologia(1984): 274–291.
Calpouzos, L., and D. B. Lapis. "Effects of light on pycnidium formation, sporulation, and tropism by Septoria nodorum." Phytopathology 60.5 (1970): 791–794.

Mycology